The 2021 Campeonato Cearense (officially the Cearense Ypióca 2021 for sponsorship reasons) was the 107th edition of Ceará's top professional football league organized by FCF. The competition began on 10 February 2021.

Due to the worsening of the COVID-19 pandemic in Brazil, the Government of Ceará suspended the Campeonato Cearense on 11 March 2021. The tournament resumed on 1 May 2021, and ended on 23 May 2021.

In the final, the defending champions Fortaleza and Ceará tied 0–0. Fortaleza were declared champions, winning their 44th title, due to their best performance in the tournament.

Format
In the first stage the teams (except the teams that participated in the 2021 Copa do Nordeste, Ceará and Fortaleza) played the other teams in a single round-robin tournament. Top six teams advanced to the second stage, while the bottom two teams were relegated to 2022 Campeonato Cearense Série B. First stage winners qualified for the 2022 Copa do Brasil.

In the second stage the first stage teams and Ceará and Fortaleza played in a single round-robin tournament. Top four teams advanced to the semi-finals.

Semi-finals and final were played on a single-leg basis, with the higher-seeded team hosting the leg. If tied, the higher-seeded team would be the winners. Champions qualified for the 2022 Copa do Brasil.

Teams

First stage

Second stage
On 10 March (1st round), Caucaia fielded, against Pacajus, the ineligible player Hugo Freitas. Due to this, Caucaia were deducted six points and sanctioned with a fine of R$5,000 after they were punished, on 23 March, by Tribunal de Justiça Desportiva do Futebol do Ceará (TJDF).

Final stages

Semi-finals

Final

Overall table

Top goalscorers

References

2021 in Brazilian football
Campeonato Cearense